Ronald "Jingle Joints" Sellers (born February 5, 1947) is a former American football player.  He played college football for Florida State University, where he was a two-time All-American (1967, 1968). Despite being limited to a total of 30 games of regular season eligibility, Sellers still holds Florida State career record for most 200-yard receiving games. He was inducted into the College Football Hall of Fame in 1988.  A wide receiver, he played for the American Football League's Boston Patriots in 1969, when he was an AFL All-Star, then for the National Football League's Patriots, Dallas Cowboys and Miami Dolphins.

Early years
Sellers attended Paxon High School where he excelled in football and basketball. He helped his team win the 1965 state basketball championship.

He went on to star at Florida State University as a split end and flanker in Bill Peterson's pro-style offense. In 1967 and 1968 he received All-American honors. He recorded 212 passes for 3,598 yards (an NCAA record at the time) and 23 touchdowns. He wore the number 34 which was retired by the school, until he gave linebacker Ernie Sims permission to use it while playing for the Seminoles.

Sellers still holds 17 receiving and scoring records at Florida State University- including single-season receptions (86), single-season receiving (1,496), single-game receptions (16), single-game receiving yards (270) single-game receiving touchdowns (5). In 2007, he was named to The State of Florida’s “100 Greatest High School Football Players in Florida History”.

In 1973, he was inducted into the Florida Sports Hall of Fame. In 1977 he was inducted into the Florida State University Hall of Fame. In 1988, he was inducted into the College Football Hall of Fame.

Professional career

New England Patriots
Sellers was selected by the Boston Patriots in the first round (6th overall) of the 1969 NFL Draft. He earned AFL All-Star honors as a rookie after making 27 receptions for 705 yards, with 6 touchdowns and 26.1 average yards per reception.

During the 1971 season, Sellers missed four games due to injuries and lost his starting position. On July 13, 1972, he was traded to the Super Bowl champions the Dallas Cowboys, in exchange for a third round draft choice (#73-Charles Davis).

Dallas Cowboys
In 1972 he was a backup until the seventh game, when he was promoted to replace Bob Hayes in the starting lineup, in order to take advantage of his big play ability. Even though he finished the season as the Cowboys top receiver, registering 31 receptions for 653 yards, five touchdowns and a 21.1 yards average per reception, the team looked to upgrade its receiving corps, by trading him along with a second round draft choice to the Super Bowl champions the Miami Dolphins, in exchange for Otto Stowe.

Miami Dolphins
In 1973, he had a disappointing season after playing in three games and catching only two passes. He was released on September 10, 1974.

References

External links
 Florida State University Hall of Fame profile
 Ron Sellers & Associates profile

1947 births
All-American college football players
American Football League All-Star players
American Football League players
American football wide receivers
Boston Patriots players
College Football Hall of Fame inductees
Dallas Cowboys players
Florida State Seminoles football players
Living people
Miami Dolphins players
New England Patriots players
Paxon School for Advanced Studies alumni
Players of American football from Jacksonville, Florida